Coleophora vitisella is a moth of the family Coleophoridae. It is found from Fennoscandia and northern Russia to the Pyrenees and Italy and from Great Britain to Romania. The range extends to the Russian Far East. The species was recently discovered in Canada, with records from Yukon and Manitoba.

Description
Adults are on wing from May to the beginning of July in western Europe.<ref>{{cite web |last1=Kimber |first1=Ian |title=37.024 BF506 Coleophora vitisella' Gregson, 1856 |url=https://ukmoths.org.uk/species/coleophora-vitisella/ |website=UKMoths |accessdate=11 November 2019}}</ref>

Larva
The larvae feed on Pyrola species and Vaccinium vitis-idaea''. The case is composed of numerous rings, each cut out of the lower epidermis of the hostplant. The rear end is strongly curved. The mouth angle is about 45°. Pupation takes place in the case at the upperside of the leaf. Development takes two years, with a diapause in early summer, when the plant develops new foliage. Full-grown larvae can be found from September to April.

References

External links

vitisella
Moths described in 1856
Moths of Asia
Moths of North America
Moths of Europe